Simonstone is a small village and civil parish in the Ribble Valley district of Lancashire, England. The population of the civil parish taken at the 2011 census was 1,154. The village adjoins the village of Read, Lancashire and neighbours Padiham.

History
St Peter's CE Church is the local Church of England building in the village and was founded in 1841. The interior of the building is modern and part is also used as the school hall and gym during the week. The building dates from 1879 and was originally a National School.

The Higher Trapp Hotel is part of the Best Western chain of hotels. It was originally built in the early 1900s as a private house, and now converted into a country hotel with 29 bedrooms.

Simonstone railway station was south of the village and closed in 1957.

Granville Technology Group was based in the village, until its closure in 2005.

Governance
Simonstone was once a township in the ancient parish of Whalley. This became a civil parish in 1866, forming part of the Burnley Rural District from 1894 to 1974. With the creation of the new local government districts in 1974 Simonstone was included in Borough of Burnley. However, after a public campaign and Boundary Commission review completed in 1985, it subsequently became part of the Borough of Ribble Valley. During the process the neighbouring civil parish of Northtown was abolished with part transferred to Simonstone, and small adjustments occurred to the boundaries with Padiham and Altham along the river.

Together with Read, the parish forms the Read and Simonstone ward of Ribble Valley Borough Council.

Landmarks

Huntroyde Hall

Huntroyde Hall was originally built for Edmund Starkie in the 16th-century and has since been modified many times. Its estate, Huntroyde Demesne (known locally as 'Huntroyde') separates Simonstone from Padiham. The house remained in the ownership of the Starkie family until 1983.

Simonstone Hall
The Hall dates from the 17th century and was originally the home of the Whitaker family. It is a privately owned listed building. The house was substantially re-built in the 18th century as an early example of Jacobean revival architecture. Ancillary buildings include a 17th-century barn and an 18th-century stables.

Education
St Peter's CE Primary School is the village's only school, with around 120 pupils. The school hosts several village events throughout the year, including the 'School Gala' (or Summer Fair) held late in June. The village is in the catchment area of the Clitheroe Royal Grammar School.

See also

Listed buildings in Simonstone, Lancashire

References

External links

Parish Council website

Villages in Lancashire
Geography of Ribble Valley
Jacobean architecture in the United Kingdom